The Bessarabian Stakes is a Canadian Thoroughbred horse race run annually since 1985 at Woodbine Racetrack in Toronto, Ontario. Raced at a distance of seven furlongs, it is held during the latter part of November and is open to fillies and mares, age three and older. It has been a Grade II event since 2013.

Inaugurated in 1985 as the Etobicoke Handicap, in 1996 it was renamed in honor of Eaton Hall Farm's Champion filly, Bessarabian.

Through 1990 the race was contested at six furlongs on dirt.
In 2006 the track surface was replaced with a Polytrack synthetic dirt which would be changed again in 2016 to Tapeta synthetic dirt. (both referred to as an "all weather track" in official charts). The purse for the Bessarabian was increased to $200,000 in 2014, plus up to $23,265 for Ontario-bred horses.

Records
Speed  record: 
 1:21.44 - Hillaby (2014) at current distance of 7 furlongs

Most wins:
 2 - Count On A Change (1991, 1992)
 2 - Early Blaze (1994, 1995)
 2 - Moonlit Promise (2017, 2018)

Most wins by an owner:
 3 - Huntington Stud Farm (1990, 1991, 1992)

Most wins by a jockey:
 4 - Jim McAleney (1993, 2002, 2006, 2013)

Most wins by a trainer:
 3 - Roger Attfield (1985, 1986, 1993)

Winners

See also
 List of Canadian flat horse races

References

 The Bessarabian Stakes at Pedigree Query

Graded stakes races in Canada
Sprint category horse races for fillies and mares
Recurring sporting events established in 1985
Woodbine Racetrack
1985 establishments in Ontario